"Questions" is a song by Belgian DJ Lost Frequencies and English singer and songwriter James Arthur. It was released on 3 June 2022.

Music video
The video for the song was released on YouTube on 17 June 2022.

Charts

References

2022 singles
2022 songs
Lost Frequencies songs
James Arthur songs
Songs written by Dan Smith (singer)
Songs written by Lost Frequencies
Songs written by James Arthur